Charles Mader Gilbert  (July 8, 1919 – August 13, 1983) was an American professional baseball outfielder who appeared in 364 games, mostly as a center fielder, in Major League Baseball for the Brooklyn Dodgers (1940), Chicago Cubs (1941–1943 and 1946) and Philadelphia Phillies (1946–1947).

Born in New Orleans, Louisiana, he was the son of former MLB outfielder and longtime minor-league manager Larry Gilbert; his brother Tookie also played in the majors. 

Charlie Gilbert served in the United States Navy in the Pacific Theatre of World War II. In his third MLB game, on April 23, 1940, he hit a pair of home runs against the Boston Bees in an 8–3 Brooklyn victory at Ebbets Field. He thus became the first player, and one of three men in the history of the Dodgers' franchise, to have a multi-home-run game in his first five starts; the others are Cody Bellinger and Yasiel Puig.

He died at age 64 in New Orleans. Gilbert's daughter  Jan went on the memorialize her late father in Goodbye, Dad, a series of mixed-media works utilizing family photographs.

References

External links

1919 births
1983 deaths
United States Navy personnel of World War II
Baseball players from New Orleans
Brooklyn Dodgers players
Chicago Cubs players
Jesuit High School (New Orleans) alumni
Major League Baseball center fielders
Montreal Royals players
Nashville Vols players
Philadelphia Phillies players